Sonja Morgenstern (born 22 January 1955) is a German figure skating coach and former competitor.

Morgenstern was coached by Jutta Müller in Chemnitz and represented the SC Karl-Marx-Stadt club and East Germany (GDR). In 1966 she won the Spartakiade in figure skating. Two years later she participated in the Winter Olympics. Her biggest success was winning the bronze medal at the European Figure Skating Championships in 1972. In the same year, she placed sixth at the Winter Olympics. Her main East German rival was Christine Errath. In 1973 Morgenstern ended her figure skating career as a result of injuries. In the early 1980s she coached the 4-year-old Stefan Lindemann.

Having retired from figure skating, Morgenstern studied educational theory in Zwickau and became a teacher. She gave up teaching in 1981 due to the illness of her son Michael who needed special care for the first four years of his life. She later became a beautician.

Results

References

1955 births
Living people
People from Frankenberg, Saxony
German female single skaters
Figure skaters at the 1968 Winter Olympics
Figure skaters at the 1972 Winter Olympics
Olympic figure skaters of East Germany
Beauticians
European Figure Skating Championships medalists
Sportspeople from Saxony
East German sportswomen
People from Bezirk Karl-Marx-Stadt
East German figure skaters